Mid Cork, a division of County Cork, was a parliamentary constituency in Ireland, represented in the Parliament of the United Kingdom. From 1885 to 1922 it returned one Member of Parliament (MP) to the House of Commons of the United Kingdom of Great Britain and Ireland.

Until the 1885 general election the area was part of the Cork County constituency. From 1922, on the establishment of the Irish Free State, it was not represented in the UK Parliament.

Boundaries
This constituency comprised the central part of County Cork, consisting of the baronies of East Muskerry and West Muskerry and that part of the barony of Barretts not contained within the constituency of North East Cork.

Members of Parliament

Elections

Elections in the 1880s

Elections in the 1890s

Elections in the 1900s

Sheehan was expelled from the IPP on the grounds of being a "factionist" and, in protest and to re-emphasize his public support, he resigned the seat and re-stood as an Independent (Labour) candidate in the resulting by-election.

Elections in the 1910s

References

Westminster constituencies in County Cork (historic)
Dáil constituencies in the Republic of Ireland (historic)
Constituencies of the Parliament of the United Kingdom established in 1885
Constituencies of the Parliament of the United Kingdom disestablished in 1922